The 2014 ONGC–GAIL Delhi Open was a professional tennis tournament played on outdoor hard courts. It is the first edition of the tournament for the men and for the women. It was part of the 2014 ATP Challenger Tour and the 2014 ITF Women's Circuit, offering a total of $100,000 in prize money in the men's event and $25,000 in the women's event. It took place in New Delhi, India, on 17–23 February 2014.

Singles main draw entrants

Seeds 

 1 Rankings as of 3 February 2014

Other entrants 
The following players received wildcards into the singles main draw:
  Saketh Myneni
  Karunuday Singh
  Ramkumar Ramanathan
  Sanam Singh

The following players received special exempt into the singles main draw:
  Ilija Bozoljac

The following players received entry from the qualifying draw:
  Axel Michon
  Daniel Cox
  Rui Machado 
  Chen Ti

Champions

Men's singles 

  Somdev Devvarman def.  Aleksandr Nedovyesov, 6–3, 6–1

Women's singles 

  Wang Qiang def.  Yuliya Beygelzimer, 6–1, 6–3

Men's doubles 

  Saketh Myneni /  Sanam Singh def.  Sanchai Ratiwatana /  Sonchat Ratiwatana, 7–6(7–5), 6–4

Women's doubles 

  Nicha Lertpitaksinchai /  Peangtarn Plipuech def.  Erika Sema /  Yurika Sema, 7–6(7–5), 6–3

External links 
Official Website

ONGC–GAIL Delhi Open
ONGC–GAIL Delhi Open
Sports competitions in Delhi
ONGC–GAIL Delhi Open
ONGC–GAIL Delhi Open